Edward Webster LeRoy (January 30, 1874 – January 1, 1940) was an American newspaper editor and politician.

Edward Webster LeRoy was born in Marinette, Wisconsin on January 30, 1874. He attended the public schools in Marinette and was the editor of the Daily Eagle and later the Daily Eagle-Star. LeRoy served in the Wisconsin State Assembly in 1903, 1905, 1907, and 1909 as a Republican. He was nominated for postmaster by President Coolidge in 1924. LeRoy died suddenly in Marinette on January 1, 1940.

Notes

References

1874 births
1940 deaths
People from Marinette, Wisconsin
Editors of Wisconsin newspapers
Republican Party members of the Wisconsin State Assembly